is Japanese pop singer Sonoko Kawai's debut studio album. It was released on December 5, 1985 through CBS Sony in LP, cassette and CD versions. It peaked at number four on the Oricon charts and sold 173,000 copies.

Overview 
The album includes the title track from Kawai's debut single "Namida no Jasmine LOVE" and its B-side "Koi no Chapter A to Z", as well as the B-side to her second single "Ochiba no Crescendo", "Gogo no Pas de Deux".

Track listing 
All tracks composed and arranged by Tsugutoshi Gotō.

1985 debut albums
Japanese-language albums